Select World Tower is a building complex located in Satu Mare, Romania. The structure is constructed in the shape of a vertical U, with two towers of 6 and 8 storeys linked together by a 2-storey smaller building. The six storey tower contains  of office spaces and a multifunctional hall. The two storey building is an  commercial center.

References

Buildings and structures in Satu Mare
History of Satu Mare
Buildings and structures completed in 2010